Son of the Morning is the second studio album by American metalcore band Oh, Sleeper. It was released on August 25, 2009, through Solid State Records.

Background and concept
Son of the Morning was recorded in 2009 at Planet Red Studios in Richmond, Virginia. The album is a concept album based on the epic battle between Satan and Jesus. Described by Kinard, the lyrics to the title track are The Devil calling out with threats to Jesus and the chorus to the song is Christ's reply. The rest of the album as follows is based on Jesus talking to people of the earth and gathering upon angels before reaching the final track "The Finisher" wherein Jesus prevails in banishing Satan and cuts off his horns.

Cover art
The cover for the album is known as a "broken pentagram". It follows exactly the same design as an inverted pentagram, but with the horns atop of it missing hence the final line of lyrics on the album. The broken pentagram was designed by the band and, since the release of Son of the Morning, it has become their trademark symbol.

Track listing

Personnel
Oh, Sleeper
Micah Kinard - lead vocals, programming, additional guitar
Shane Blay - lead guitar, clean vocals
James Erwin - rhythm guitar
Lucas Starr - bass guitar
Matt Davis - drums, percussion

Production
Produced by Andreas Magnusson

References

2009 albums
Solid State Records albums
Oh, Sleeper albums
Concept albums
Fiction about the Devil